The Military Courts of Kyrgyzstan (Kyrgyz: Кыргызстандын Аскердик соттор; Russian: Военные суды Кыргызстана) are courts that deal with criminal cases concerning military personnel. Most courts are located in military garrisons all over the country and have jurisdiction over all criminal cases about crimes committed by servicemen. There is no mention of military courts in the Constitution of Kyrgyzstan and organizations such as Crisis Group Asia argue that there has been some discussion of abolishing these courts and transferring their duties to local courts. In December 2016, President Almazbek Atambayev signed a decree officially abolishing the use of military courts. This was done due to a recommendation made by the Commission for the Reform of the Judicial System, which said that the state budget couldn't fund them anymore.

See also
Courts of Kyrgyzstan
Armed Forces of Kyrgyzstan

References

Judiciary of Kyrgyzstan
Military of Kyrgyzstan
Military courts